Tarentola panousei is a species of gecko. It is native to Morocco, Mauritania, and Western Sahara.

References

Tarentola
Reptiles described in 1959